The 1903–04 WPHL season was the seventh season of operation for the Western Pennsylvania Hockey League. Four Pittsburgh-area teams competed in the season, in which all games were played at the Duquesne Gardens. However, the Pittsburgh Keystones withdrew from the league on January 17, 1904. The season concluded with the Pittsburgh Victorias having the best record in the league and being named league champions. It would be the team's only league title. The season also marked the final WPHL season until 1907 as the city formed the Pittsburgh Professionals a professional club to compete in the International Professional Hockey League.

Final standings

References

 

Western Pennsylvania Hockey League seasons
WPHL